Carlops is a small village in the Pentland Hills, within the Scottish Borders area of Scotland, close to the boundary with Midlothian. It lies between West Linton and Penicuik.

The village was founded in 1784 and developed cotton weaving, coalmining and limestone mining.

Folklore maintained that witches would leap from one face to the other, over the chasm, for entertainment of an evening.

Notable residents

C. T. R. Wilson (1869–1959), winner of the Nobel Prize for Physics in 1927, retired to Carlops and died there in 1959.
Dr Archibald "Archie" Lamont FRSE FGS (21 October 1907 – 16 March 1985), Scottish geologist, palaeontologist, Scottish Nationalist, writer, poet and politician, retired to Carlops and lived in Jess Cottage.

See also
List of places in the Scottish Borders
List of places in Scotland

External links

RCAHMS record for Carlops, Spittal
RCAHMS record for Carlops Hill
SCRAN image: Allan Ramsay Hotel, Main Street, Carlops
Geological Conservation Review / JNCC: Subglacial meltwater

Villages in the Scottish Borders